Nick Young (born December 12, 1948 in Princeton, Illinois) is an American broadcast journalist now retired from CBS News. Young is former anchor of the morning CBS World News Roundup on the CBS Radio Network. He was born Nicholas Yeazel.

Early career
Young's broadcast career began in 1968 in his hometown. After his 1971 graduation from the University of Missouri's School of Journalism, Young joined the staff of WLW Radio in Cincinnati, Ohio, hosting an overnight telephone talk show.

In 1975 Young moved to WEEI Radio, Boston, Massachusetts, as a midday anchor. Four years later, he became the morning anchor at Boston's WHDH, partnering with co-host Jess Cain. While at WHDH he was involved along with the staff in award-winning coverage of many important local stories, including a major chemical spill, that was singled out for honors by Sigma Delta Chi, the Society of Professional Journalists.

In the summer of 1983 Young moved to New York City as a Correspondent for RKO/United Stations/Unistar Radio Networks. For the next seven years he anchored hourly newscasts and many major events. From 1983-1984, he also co-anchored the weekly hour-long "Newsweek On Air" with David Alpern.

Life at CBS
In 1990 Young joined CBS News. During the next twenty years, Young covered many of the day's major stories—the O. J. Simpson trial, the aftermath of the Oklahoma City bombing, Mike Tyson's rape trial, political conventions, national campaigns, the wars in the Persian Gulf, the 9-11 attacks, the funeral of Mother Teresa, and other important assignments. In 2006 he was named successor to World News Roundup anchor Christopher Glenn, who announced his retirement in February. On March 25, 2010 Young announced his retirement from CBS News.

After his departure, he returned to Princeton, Illinois, Young was a freelance anchor at Chicago's WBBM Newsradio 780 and 105.9 FM from 2010-2020 when he retired from radio.

Young continues to work as an audiobook narrator.  

He is a painter who has had shows in New York and Illinois. 

He is also a writer whose work has appeared in more than two dozen publications, including the Pennsylvania Literary Journal, the  San Antonio Review, the Fiery Scribe Review, Sandpiper Magazine, 50-Word Stories, Open Ceilings Magazine, the Pigeon Review, Flyover Country, Typeslash Review, Short Story Town, Sein und Werden, The Green Silk Journal, The Chamber Magazine, The Best of CafeLit 11 and Vols. I and II of the Writer Shed Stories anthologies.

Personal life
Young lives in Princeton with wife Deborah. Their son, Christopher is also a resident of the city.

Honors
 Sigma Delta Chi Award: Distinguished Service Award
 Society of Professional Journalists: Bronze Medallion
 The Radio Television Digital News Association:  Edward R. Murrow Award

References

 Nick Young Bio: Westwood One
 Christopher Glenn Retires: CBS News

1948 births
Living people
American television reporters and correspondents
University of Missouri alumni
People from Princeton, Illinois
Journalists from Illinois